Tommy Riggs and Betty Lou was a radio situation comedy broadcast in various time slots from 1938 to 1946.

Career
Tommy Riggs (born October 21, 1908 in Pittsburgh) switched back and forth from his natural baritone to the voice of a seven-year-old girl, Betty Lou. These dialogues found a shape in later episodes when the character of Betty Lou Barrie was established as Riggs' niece.

In 1931, Riggs ran a poultry business, as well as serving as a pianist-vocalist on radio station WCAE in Pittsburgh. When station manager J.L. Coffin heard Riggs' little girl voice, he put The Tom and Betty Program on WCAE's schedule, and Riggs later moved on to KDKA (Pittsburgh), WTAM (Cleveland) and, in 1937, WLW (Cincinnati), where Harry Frankel (aka Singin' Sam) called a New York agent. An audition in New York led to a transcribed series for Chevrolet, and after Rudy Vallée heard the Chevrolet show, Riggs' agent told him he had two days to get ready for an appearance on Vallée's Royal Gelatin Hour. Vallée signed him for a 13-week contract. The audience reaction was strong: Riggs wound up spending a record 49 weeks on the Vallee show, catapulting him to fame and his own program.

The cast included Bert Wheeler, Hank Ladd, and Dick Wheeler. Ben Gage was the announcer, and Victor Young was musical director. Anita Ellis was the program's vocalist. Sam Moore and Robert Brewster were writer and producer, respectively.

It was one of the earliest shows scripted by comedy writer, comedian and bestselling author Jack Douglas. Despite the contributions of Douglas, Riggs never attained a level equal to that of Fanny Brice, famed for her Baby Snooks character. In the 1940s, Riggs faded as the popularity of Edgar Bergen (whose Charlie McCarthy character was inevitably compared to Betty Lou) expanded. Tommy Riggs and Betty Lou ran from 1938 to 1940 on NBC, then returned for the summer of 1942 on CBS, after which was picked up for a single season on NBC in 1942–43. Riggs then joined the Navy, taking Betty Lou to Allied camps in the Far East for 18 months; when he returned, radio audiences had largely forgotten him. Riggs had a final run on CBS in the summer of 1946, after which returned to Pittsburgh, where he died in 1967.

Legacy
Tommy Riggs was later awarded a star on the Hollywood Walk of Fame, and is one of only two honorees who share his star with a fictional character (the other, Clayton Moore and the Lone Ranger).

In order to find out how he was able to do Betty Lou's voice in the first place, Riggs consulted with doctors at Cornell Medical College. He was told that his throat muscles were unusually large and strong—the strongest they had seen, causing the unusual condition.

References

External links
 Tommy Riggs and Betty Lou on  Internet Archive

1930s American radio programs
1930s in comedy
1940s American radio programs
American comedy radio programs
NBC radio programs
CBS Radio programs